Codex Monacensis (plural Monacenses) is the designation of several codices housed at the Bavarian State Library in Munich. These include:

 Codex Latinus Monacensis (clm), several related Vetus Latina manuscripts
 Frisingensia Fragmenta (Frising.) 24 and 236, also known as Codex Frisingensis or Codex Latinus Monacensis (clm) 6436, Gospels and Catholic Epistles
 Codex latinus monacensis (clm) 6220, 6230, 6277, 6317, 28135, Pauline and Catholic Epistles
 Fragmentum Monacense, Matthew 9–10; see 
 Munich Palimpsest (clm 6225), Exodus–Deuteronomy; see 
 Codex latinus monacensis (clm 6239), Tobit, Judith, Esther
 Codex Monacensis (X 033), a Greek uncial manuscript of the Gospels, dated palaeographically to the 9th or 10th century
 Munich Serbian Psalter, also known as Codex Monacensis Slavicus 4, a 14th-century illuminated psalter written in Church Slavonic of the Serbian recension
 Cgm 558 (Codex germanicus monacensis 558), a convolution of two 15th-century manuscripts

See also 
 
 CGM (disambiguation)